Bhairab River is a river in south-western Bangladesh, a distributary of the Ganges. It passes through Khulna, dividing the city into two parts. Bhairab River originates from Tengamari border of Meherpur District and passes through Jessore city.

Early history

The Bhairab, which is considered to be of older origin than its parent river the Jalangi, takes off from that river at a point, a few miles north of Karimpur near Akheriganj at Bhagwangola (Vidhan Sabha constituency) in Murshidabad district (in West Bengal). After a tortuous course towards the south it turns to the east forming the boundary line between Meherpur P.S. (Bangladesh) and Karimpur (India) for a short distance and then turning south enters Meherpur P.S. and flows past Meherpur town to the south and loses itself in the Mathabhanga close to the east of Kapashdanga. Its intake from the Jalangi having silted up, this river has been practically dead since long. The poor climate of Meherpur, which lies upon its banks is in great measure attributed to the stagnancy of its water.

Geography
Bhairab River has two main branches, the Khulna-Ichamati and the Kobadak. The Khulna-Ichamati forms a boundary between Bangladesh and India. The towns of Khulna and Jessore are situated on the bank of the river. The development of their settlements and culture were influenced by the river. The Rupsa River is formed from the Bhairab and the Atai River, and flows into the Pasur River.

References

External links
 

Rivers of Bangladesh
Rivers of Khulna Division